Sir William James Lynton Blair (born 31 March 1950) is a British retired judge. He was previously a Queen's Counsel at London barristers' chambers 3 Verulam Buildings, specialising in domestic and international banking and finance law. He is the elder brother of Sir Tony Blair, the former British prime minister.

Professor of Financial Law and Ethics at the Centre for Commercial Law Studies, Queen Mary University of London, he served as a High Court Judge in England and Wales for nearly ten years, and was Judge in Charge of the Commercial Court from 2016. 

In 2017, Blair rejoined 3 Verulam Buildings as an Associate Member and international arbitrator, and is now a member of 3VB's [International Advisory and Dispute Resolution Unit (IADRU).

He is the Chair of the Bank of England’s Enforcement Decision Making Committee (EDMC) and in 2018 was appointed to the International Commercial Expert Committee of the Supreme People’s Court of the People’s Republic of China.

Career
Blair became a Queen's Counsel in 1994, appearing and advising in many domestic and international disputes and matters particularly in the financial field. 

He was appointed a recorder in 1998. He became a deputy High Court judge in 2003 and was in the same year admitted as a barrister of the Eastern Caribbean Supreme Court in the Territory of the Virgin Islands.

On 4 February 2008 it was announced that the Queen had approved his appointment as a High Court judge, assigned to the Queen's Bench Division. He was sworn in on 28 February. In 2016 he became judge in charge of the Commercial Court.

He became a member of London's Financial Markets Law Committee in 2008.

In 2012, he became the first President of the Board of Appeal of the European Supervisory Authorities, serving until 2019.

He is or has been a visiting professor of law at the London School of Economics, Peking University Law School, East China University of Politics and Law and the University of Hong Kong. He has also been, since 1999, an Honorary Fellow of the Society for Advanced Legal Studies (1997), and an academic adviser to the Asian Institute of International Financial Law.

From 2001 to 2008 he served, part-time, as a chairman of the Financial Services and Markets Tribunal (Finsmat) and from 2003 to 2005 he was chairman of the Commercial Bar Association (Combar). He is also chairman of the International Monetary Law Committee of the International Law Association (2004-2021), and of the Qatar Financial Centre Regulatory Tribunal.

Along with Lord Woolf, the former Lord Chief Justice of England and Wales, he served as the Co-Convener of the inaugural Qatar Law Forum of Global Leaders in Law, held in Doha, Qatar, from 29–31 May 2009.

He retired as a High Court Judge on 1 December 2017 to take up a position as Professor of Financial Law and Ethics at the Centre for Commercial Law Studies, Queen Mary University of London.

Since 2018, as well as arbitration, he has also sat part-time as a Deputy Judge of the High Court of Hong Kong SAR (where he is given a Chinese name "貝理賢" by the Hong Kong Judiciary), and in Qatar International Court. At the China International Commercial Court, he has spoken on legal issues.

He is a member of the Ethics Committee of Digital Catapult’s AI Machine Intelligence Garage.

Publications
 Co-editor, Research Handbook on Ethics in Banking and Finance (Edward Elgar Publishing 2019)
 Co-editor, Banks and Financial Crime, the International Law of Tainted Money, 2nd edn (Oxford University Press, 2017)
 General editor of Bullen, Leake & Jacob's Precedents of Pleadings, 18th edition, Sweet & Maxwell, London, 2015
 Co-consultant editor of Butterworths Banking Law Handbook, 8th edition (December 2010)
 Co-author of Banking and Financial Services Regulation, 3rd edition, Butterworths, London, 2002
 Co-editor Encyclopaedia of Banking Law (Butterworths, London, 1999)
 Editor of Banks and Remedies, LLP, London, 1999
 Editor of Banks, Liability and Risk, 3rd edition, LLP, London, 2001

References

External links
 UK Government's Judiciary List site

1950 births
Living people
British people of Scottish descent
Academics of Queen Mary University of London
Academics of the London School of Economics
Alumni of Balliol College, Oxford
British barristers
English legal scholars
20th-century English judges
British King's Counsel
Knights Bachelor
Members of Lincoln's Inn
People educated at Fettes College
People educated at the Chorister School, Durham
20th-century King's Counsel
Queen's Bench Division judges
21st-century English judges